Gaadhiffushi as a place name may refer to:
 Gaadhiffushi (Dhaalu Atoll) (Republic of Maldives)
 Gaadhiffushi (Thaa Atoll) (Republic of Maldives)